Riza Lushta is a multi-use stadium in Mitrovica, Kosovo. It was named after notable Juventus player Riza Lushta, who was from Mitrovica, and is used mostly for football matches and is the home ground of Trepça'89 of the Kosovar Superliga. The stadium has a capacity of 12,000 people.

References

Mitrovica, Kosovo
Mitrovica
Stadium